The land of Goshen (ʾEreṣ Gōšen) is named in the Hebrew Bible as the place in Egypt given to the Hebrews by the pharaoh of Joseph (Book of Genesis), and the land from which they later left Egypt at the time of the Exodus. It is believed to have been located in the eastern Nile Delta, lower Egypt; perhaps at or near Avaris, the seat of power of the Hyksos kings.

In the biblical text
The land of Goshen is mentioned in the biblical books of Genesis and Exodus. In the story of Joseph, which comprises the final chapters of Genesis, the patriarch Jacob is facing famine and sends ten of his sons to Egypt to buy grain. Joseph, another of Jacob's sons, is a high official in Egypt and allows his father and brothers to settle in Egypt. In Genesis 45:10, Goshen is treated as being close to Joseph, who lives at the pharaoh's court and in Genesis 47:5 Goshen is called "the best part" of the land of Egypt. But it is also implied to be somewhat set apart from the rest of Egypt, because Joseph tells his family to present themselves to the pharaoh as keepers of livestock, "in order that you may settle in the land of Goshen, because all shepherds are abhorrent to the Egyptians." Genesis 47:11 interchanges the "land of Rameses" with Goshen: "Joseph settled his father and his brothers and granted them a holding in the land of Egypt, in the best part of the land, in the land of Rameses, as Pharaoh had instructed."

In Exodus, Jacob's descendants, the Israelites, continue to live in Egypt and grow numerous. The name of Goshen appears only twice in Exodus, in the narration of the Plagues of Egypt, in which Goshen, as the dwelling place of the Israelites is spared the plague of flies and plague of hail that afflict the Egyptians.

Meaning of the name
If the Septuagint reading "Gesem" is correct, the word, which in its Hebrew form has no known meaning, may mean "cultivated"—comparing the Arabic root j-š-m, "to labor".  Egyptologists have suggested a connection with the Egyptian word qis, meaning "inundated land".   Because Goshen was apparently the same region, called by the Greeks the "Arabian nome," which had its capital at Phakousa. The name represented the Egyptian Pa-qas (Brugsch, Geog., I, 298), the name of a town, with the determinative for "pouring forth". Donald Redford, while not disputing the location of Goshen, gives a different origin for the name, deriving it from "Gasmu," the rulers of the Bedouin Qedarites who occupied the eastern Delta from the 7th century BCE, but John Van Seters thinks this unlikely.

Identification

Although the scholar John Van Seters has opposed the identification of ʾEreṣ Gōšen with the Qedarite territories in eastern Egypt based on claims that the Qedarites never ruled the region of the Wādī Ṭumīlāt, the discovery in the Wādī Ṭumīlāt region of Qedarite remains, such as a shrine to the goddess al-Lāt, makes Van Seters's opposition to this identification untenable.

References

Works cited

 

 
 
 
 

Book of Genesis
Egypt in the Hebrew Bible
Geography of ancient Egypt
Nile Delta
Goshen, Land of
Wadi Tumilat